The 1947–48 season was Port Vale's 36th season of football in the English Football League, and their third full season in the Third Division South. Gaining just three of their sixteen victories away from home, they were very much a club of two teams. Manager Gordon Hodgson continued his policy of developing young players, whilst work on the new stadium continued. Their club record run without failing to score reached 33 games, ending on 13 March 1948, having begun on 19 October 1946.

Overview

Third Division South
The pre-season saw the arrival of outside-right John Currie from Bournemouth & Boscombe Athletic. The total number of players at the club was 81, though the vast majority of these amateurs who never played for the first team. Standing season tickets were reduced to £3 13s, in an attempt to boost support.

The season began with a 1–1 draw with Bristol Rovers in front of 15,714 supporters, followed four days later by a 2–1 win at Carrow Road. Following this the Vale were exceptional at home but poor away, as their unbeaten run at home reached fifteen games. Their home form was exemplified by 6–4 and 7–0 wins over Aldershot and Watford respectively, in which Ronnie Allen scored a hat-trick in both games, and Morris Jones score a hat-trick past Aldershot. The defence seeming too weak for a promotion push, Harry Hubbick was signed from Bolton Wanderers in October. The Sentinel'''s "Placer" complained of the weakened passing of the post-war generation, in both the Vale side and in footballers in general. In November Morris Jones was sold to Swindon Town for £2,500, having handed in a transfer request. Gordon Hodgson searched for new attacking talents, leaving his players to relax with games of table tennis, darts, and reading material. On Christmas day a 5–0 win was recorded over Brighton & Hove Albion, with defender Tommy Cheadle put into the centre-forward role. This marked the start of an eight match unbeaten run which took the "Valiants" into fourth place by the end of January.

Hodgson's policy of youth over experience led many older players to hand in transfer requests. In January Alf Bellis was traded to Bury in exchange for Walter Keeley and 'a substantial fee'. A 5–0 thrashing at muddy Plainmoor from Torquay United in February was followed by a win over Swindon Town which was disturbed by a dog on the pitch, whilst the week after came a draw in three inches of snow at Southend United. The club's promotion hopes faded with a defeat by Notts County at the Rec, England star Tommy Lawton scoring the winner. In preparation for next season Joe Dale was signed from Manchester United for £1,000. The last game of the season attracted 5,602 spectators – the lowest total of the season – ironically this was against Exeter City, their opponents in the highest attended home game of the previous campaign. This low attendance was partly blamed on the FA Cup final, which was broadcast at the same time.

They finished in eighth place with 43 points, thereby barely improving on the previous season. Ronnie Allen was the top-scorer with just thirteen goals. Scoring was very much a team effort.

Finances
On the financial side, a loss of £1,292 was reported – mainly due to a transfer debit. Gate receipts had increased to £26,666 and the wage bill had risen drastically to £13,647. Cash was needed for the ongoing construction of 'The Wembley of the North', and so schemes such as the '100 Club' were introduced, offering supporters a seat for life at the stadium at a cost of £100. Meanwhile Norman Hallam departed in the summer, who left the area to become a Methodist Minister in Carlisle.

Cup competitions
In the FA Cup, Vale fell at the first hurdle, losing 2–1 to Crystal Palace at Selhurst Park in a below-par performance.

League table

ResultsPort Vale's score comes first''

Football League Third Division South

Results by matchday

Matches

FA Cup

Player statistics

Appearances

Top scorers

Transfers

Transfers in

Transfers out

References
Specific

General

Port Vale F.C. seasons
Port Vale